Poverty Beach or Sewell Point is a barrier spit, approximately 2.5 miles (4 km) in length entirely within the City of Cape May, along the Atlantic Ocean coast of eastern New Jersey in the United States. It is the southernmost barrier island in New Jersey.

Description
Geologically, Poverty Beach is a sand spit or barrier spit, extending northeast from the mainland at Cape Island to Sewell Point at Cold Spring Inlet. Often the entire spit is referred to as Sewell Point. On its northwestern side, the peninsula encloses manmade Cape May Harbor.

Poverty Beach was described in 1834 as,

An 1878 description stated,

Poverty Beach was widened by land reclamation involving the filling of Cape Island Sound and the creation of Cape May Harbor from salt marsh in the early 20th century.

Poverty Beach has been part of Cape May since 1848. Much of Poverty Beach is taken up by the United States Coast Guard Training Center Cape May.

References

External links
Training Center Cape May official website

Barrier islands of New Jersey
Landforms of Cape May County, New Jersey
Cape May, New Jersey
Peninsulas of New Jersey
Spits of the United States
Beaches of Cape May County, New Jersey
Beaches of New Jersey